Apple in Your Eye is a 2014 Taiwanese television series. The series was produced by Qinai Studio Ltd. It stars Lan Cheng-lung, Amber An,   and An He as the main leads. It was first aired on August 8, 2014 on TTV Main Channel after Prince William and last aired on November 7, 2014.

Synopsis 
The Zhou family has high hopes in giving birth to a son, but was disappointed when Zhou Ji Wei was born a girl, making her the third daughter in line. Because she was a disappointment to the family, she was only ever given hand me downs from her sisters. She felt no love from her family, but luckily she feels the love of a family from her neighbor especially Dai Nai Nai. There she meets her 'brother' Dai Yao Qi and follows him around trying to be the best sister ever, however he has never wanted to have a sister. As she tries her best to be close to him as his sister, she slowly realizes the feelings she holds for him are not love for a brother but something more.

Cast

Main cast 
Lan Cheng-lung as Dai Yao Qi
Amber An as Zhou Ji Wei
 as Fang Shao Min
An He as Yuan Fang

Extended cast 
Wu Ding Qian as A Bin
Lai Pei Ying as Zhou Ji Xuan
Patty Wu as Chou Chi-ju
Li Zheng Da as Li Zheng
Zhou Ming Fu as A Guang
Zhang Ting Hu as Xiao Se
Liu Lu Cun as Xiao Suang
Yang Xiao Jun as Xiao Feng
Bamboo Chen as Chou Chi-ju's fiancé
Lin Mei-hsiu as Mei
Winnie Chang as A&Z employee
Hsia Ching Ting
Phoebe Huang
Wu Ding Qian
Ding Ye Tian
Jag Huang as San-mi (Chou Kuan-hsiung)
Zhong Xin Ling

Broadcast

Episode ratings 
Competing dramas on rival channels airing at the same time slot were:
SETTV – Pleasantly Surprised
SET - , 
FTV - 
CTS - 
CTV – God's Gift – 14 Days

Awards and nominations

References

External links 
 Apple in Your Eye Official Website on TTV

2014 Taiwanese television series debuts
2014 Taiwanese television series endings
Taiwan Television original programming
Gala Television original programming
Television shows written by Mag Hsu